Hans Kristian Rudland (born 16 April 1997) is a Norwegian racing cyclist. He competed in the men's team time trial event at the 2017 UCI Road World Championships.

Major results
2017
 5th Overall Olympia's Tour

References

External links

1997 births
Living people
Norwegian male cyclists
Place of birth missing (living people)